The Atmospheric Radiation Measurement Climate Research Facility (ARM Climate Research Facility) is a multi-laboratory United States Department of Energy scientific user facility used for national and international global climate research efforts.

The ARM Climate Research Facility consists of three heavily instrumented fixed-location atmospheric observatories and mobile and aerial research facilities that measure radiative properties of the atmosphere, particularly cloud and aerosol formation processes. Continuous data from these sites, as well as supplemental data obtained through intensive field research campaigns, are available to scientists online through the ARM Data Archive. ARM is collaboratively managed by nine DOE national laboratories.

Mission
ARM seeks to provide the climate research community with strategically located in situ and remote-sensing observatories designed to improve the understanding and representation, in climate and earth system models, of clouds and aerosols as well as their interactions and coupling with the Earth’s surface. ARM focuses on obtaining continuous measurements—supplemented by field campaigns—and providing data products that promote the advancement of climate models.

History
ARM was established in 1989 by the U.S. Department of Energy to develop several highly instrumented ground stations. During the early years of the program, ARM focused on establishing field research sites, developing and procuring instruments, and developing techniques for both atmospheric retrievals and model evaluation. To obtain the most useful climate data, three main sites were chosen that represented a broad range of weather conditions.

Atmospheric Observatories
The Southern Great Plains (SGP) atmospheric observatory was the first field measurement site established by the ARM user facility. This observatory is the world’s largest and most extensive climate research facility.

Scientists use data from the SGP to learn about cloud, aerosol and atmospheric processes, which in turn leads to improvements in models of the Earth’s climate. The SGP observatory consists of in situ and remote-sensing instrument clusters arrayed across approximately 9,000 square miles in north-central Oklahoma and south Kansas.

The North Slope of Alaska (NSA) atmospheric observatory provides data about cloud and radiative processes at high latitudes. This observatory includes a central facility at Barrow (known officially as Utqiaġvik) and, to the east, the third ARM Mobile Facility at Oliktok Point.

The NSA is a focal point for atmospheric and ecological research activity in the Arctic. Scientists use data from the NSA to improve the representation of high-latitude cloud and radiation processes in earth system models.

The Eastern North Atlantic atmospheric observatory is the newest measurement site established by the ARM user facility. This observatory is located on Graciosa Island in the Azores archipelago. The Azores are located in the northeastern Atlantic Ocean west of Portugal.

The Tropical Western Pacific sites, where data was collected from 1996 to 2014, obtained data from the "warm pool" where the warmest sea surface temperatures on the planet and widespread convective clouds play a large role in the interannual variability observed in the global climate system. This site was discontinued in August 2014.

Mobile and aerial observatories
In addition to the fixed-location observatories, ARM also offers mobile and aerial facilities.  

Mobile observatories
To explore research questions beyond those addressed by ARM’s fixed atmospheric observatories located in Alaska, Oklahoma, and the Azores, scientists can propose a field campaign to use one of three ARM mobile facilities (AMF) to collect atmospheric and climate data from under-sampled regions around the world.

Each AMF is designed to operate in any environment—from the cold of the Arctic to the heat of the tropics—for campaigns typically lasting about a year.

ARM Aerial Facility

Aerial observatory capabilities of the ARM user facility are operated by the ARM Aerial Facility (AAF). The AAF provides airborne measurements required to answer research questions proposed by scientists from around the world.

References

External links

U.S. Department of Energy

Atmospheric radiation
Meteorology research and field projects
United States Department of Energy